Scolopia crassipes is a species of plant in the family Salicaceae. It is endemic to Sri Lanka.

Culture
Known as ක‍ටු කෙන්ද (katu kenda) in Sinhala.

External sources

 https://www.gbif.org/species/3879399/
 https://www.europeana.eu/portal/record/11608/NBGB_NBGB_BELGIUM_BR0000005056194.html
 http://arctos.database.museum/name/Scolopia%20crassipes
 http://www.ipni.org/ipni/advPlantNameSearch.do?find_genus=Scolopia&find_isAPNIRecord=on&find_isGCIRecord=on&find_isIKRecord=on&output_format=normal

Endemic flora of Sri Lanka
crassipes